Hudun is a historical town in Sool region of Somaliland.

Overview
Located in north west Somalia, and southeast Somaliland, Hudun lies 59 kilometres north by road from the provincial capital of Las Anod.

Education
According to the Ministry of National Planning and Development in Somaliland, there are 9 primary schools and 1 secondary school in the Hudun District.

History
On February 15, 1960, before Somaliland's independence, the first democratic elections were held in British Somaliland, and Ibrahim Eid was selected as the representative from Hudun.

The Somaliland government did not hold polls here during the 2005 Somaliland parliamentary election, citing Hudun as a disputed territory.

In March 2012, the militant group Al-Shabaab near Hudun was exterminated by Somali Federal Army and Ethiopian Army.

In November 2012, the president of Khatumo State declared victory in the battle against the Somaliland army in Hudun.

In January 2013, Khatumo militia based in southern Hudun were defeated and displaced by Somaliland forces. The captured militia were imprisoned in Burao.

In August 2017, the Somaliland government held a voting process for national elections in Hudun, which was opposed by Hudun residents as belonging to Puntland, and fighting took place between the Somaliland army and local forces in Hudun.

In May 2021, voter turnout in Hudun and other Dhulbahante clan-inhabited areas in the Somaliland parliamentary election was significantly higher than in the previous election in 2005.

Demographics
The City of Hudun is primarily populated the Dhulbahante clan, with the Naleye Ahmed sub-subtribe of the Mohamoud Garad branch of the Dhulbahante clan are well-represented.
Other Mohamoud Garad subtribes like the Mohamoud Ugadhyahan and the Hinjinleh clan of the Baho Nugaaled also inhabit the city.

Notes

Populated places in Sool, Somaliland